Kay Tremblay (13 March 1914 – 9 August 2005) was a Canadian film actress, also appearing on television and theatre. She was best known for her Gemini Award-winning role of Great Aunt Eliza on Road to Avonlea.

Biography
Born in Scotland, she began her career with the George Ballachine Ballet at Theatre Royal in London. Tremblay arrived in Canada after her marriage and began her Canadian artistic career in 1954.
Kay Tremblay lived in a thatched cottage at 46a high street, Flore, Northants, UK, from the 1960s. She named the property "The Farthings" as she said this was all she had left after she purchased it.

Career
Her Canadian career was namely in television, but she worked briefly at the Stratford Festival from 1989 to 1990. She won a Gemini Award in 1997 for Best Performance by an Actress in a Featured Supporting Role in a Dramatic Series in Road to Avonlea, and a Gemini nomination in 1989 for Best Guest Performance in a Series by an Actor or Actress in Night Heat.

Death
Tremblay died on 9 August 2005 at the age of 91.

Filmography

External links 

 
 CBC Arts: Aunt Eliza of 'Road to Avonlea' dies at 91
 Kay Tremblay

1914 births
2005 deaths
Canadian film actresses
Canadian television actresses
Canadian stage actresses
Best Supporting Actress in a Drama Series Canadian Screen Award winners
Actresses from Glasgow
People from Stratford, Ontario